The Ancestral Thames is the geologically ancient precursor to the present day River Thames.

Relationships with other rivers
During the Early and Middle Pleistocene, central and southern Britain had two main rivers of more than : the Bytham and the Ancestral Thames. For most of the Early Pleistocene the Ancestral Thames was the main river with, at its maximum extent, a catchment area that extended into Wales alongside the Chiltern Hills, through southern East Anglia and finally into Doggerland (now the North Sea), where it joined the Ancestral Rhine. In the early Ice Age the Thames took a line similar to the present-day River Thame, through parts of Bedfordshire, Hertfordshire and north-west Essex, then took a course resembling that of the River Waveney along the Suffolk/Norfolk border. 

Initially the more northerly Bytham River was a tributary of the Thames but as the climate warmed it progressively extended its catchment. During the Anglian Stage the Bytham river more or less disappeared and the Thames was diverted to its present course through London.

Loubourg River system
During the last glacial maximum, much of what is now the southern part of the North Sea was land, known to palaeogeographers  as Doggerland. At this time, the Thames, the Meuse, the Scheldt and the Rhine probably joined before flowing into the sea, in a system known as the Loubourg or Lobourg River. There is some debate as to whether this river would have flowed south-west into what is now the English Channel, or north into the North Sea close to modern Yorkshire. Current scientific research favours the former opinion, with the Thames and Rhine meeting in a large lake, the outflow of which was close to the present-day Straits of Dover.

Vestiges
Before its diversion, this river and its tributaries formed a river system draining the Welsh mountains and bringing some of their characteristic volcanic rocks into this area. The evidence for this is a substantial thickness of what is called Kesgrave Sands and Gravels which represent the bed of the river. These old Thames gravels contain a variety of distinctive pebbles from as far away as North Wales, evidence of the ancient drainage catchment.

The gravels also contain large boulders of puddingstone and sarsens, which are very hard conglomerates and sandstones respectively. They are believed to be derived from pebble and sand seams in the Reading Beds (subsequently cemented by quartz). They have been put to use by man as ancient way markers at road junctions. The gravels have great commercial value and are worked in numerous pits between Harlow, Chelmsford and Colchester, where the ancestral Thames flowed at least 600,000 years ago.
During this time the River Medway flowed north across east Essex to join the Thames near Clacton, leaving behind a ribbon of distinctive gravel which can be found between Burnham-on-Crouch and Bradwell-on-Sea. There were also other northward-flowing tributaries of the early Thames. Evidence of these are the patches of gravel that are found near the tops of the modest hills in south Essex, principally the Langdon Hills, Warley and High Beach in Epping Forest.

References

Geology of England
Former rivers
Rivers of England
River Thames